Ophélie Gaillard (born 13 June 1974) is a French cellist.

Early life
Gaillard was born in Paris. While studying at the Conservatoire de Paris, she obtained three first prizes in music: one in chamber music in the class of Maurice Bourgue, one in cello in the class of Philippe Muller, and one in baroque cello in the class of Christophe Coin. A recipient of a Certificate of Aptitude in cello pedagogy and a license in musicology from the Sorbonne, Gaillard has been teaching since 2000.

In 1998, she won third prize in the International Johann Sebastian Bach Competition, and was voted "Revelation: Solo Instrumentalist of the Year" at the Victoires de la musique classique in 2003. She is a recitalist and champion of the solo cello repertoire, from the Bach suites to contemporary music.

Career
Her recordings from the Ambroisie label of the solo Bach cello suites, Britten's cello suites, and his cello sonata with pianist Vanessa Wagner were noticed by music critics internationally.

Collaborations

Since 2004, she has worked with accordionist Pascal Contet. She also collaborates with dancers, in particular Daniel Larrieu and Sidi Larbi Cherkaoui.

In 2005, Ophélie Gaillard founded Pulcinella, a chamber ensemble dedicated to playing Baroque music on period instruments.

Instruments

Ophélie Gaillard plays a rare cello made by Francesco Goffriller in 1737. After a knifepoint robbery in Paris on 15 February 2018, reported on Facebook, it was anonymously returned two days later.

She also owns an 1855 Bernardel cello, which she uses for romantic and modern music.

References

External links
 Official site
 Site for her ensemble, Pulcinella

Musicians from Paris
1974 births
French women classical cellists
Living people
Conservatoire de Paris alumni
21st-century French women musicians
21st-century cellists